John Hunter (1871 – 29 November 1946) was a Scottish professional golfer who played in the late 19th century and early 20th century. Hunter finished in eighth place in the 1898 Open Championship. He won the first Scottish Professional Championship at Panmure Golf Club in 1907 with a score of 304 over four rounds, which included a record round of 71 in the third round.

Early life
Hunter was born in Prestwick, Scotland, in 1871. He was the son of Charles Hunter, keeper of the greens at the Prestwick course and also one of the first eight competitors in the inaugural 1860 Open Championship. Hunter's father was first hired as Old Tom Morris's successor but also had a short stint at Royal Blackheath in the 1860s.

Hunter apprenticed as a club maker under the direction of Old Tom Morris at St Andrews. He returned to Prestwick in 1893 and joined his father in his club and ball making business. Some clubs they produced are marked "C & J Hunter" while others are marked with the name of one or the other of the Hunters.

He had two brothers, David and William, who both emigrated to the United States and worked as golf professionals. David worked at the Essex Country Club in New Jersey for 29 years. Hunter also came to the U.S. for a short time but returned to live in Scotland.

Golf career

1898 Open Championship
The 1898 Open Championship was the 38th Open Championship, held 8–9 June at Prestwick Golf Club in Prestwick, South Ayrshire, Scotland. Harry Vardon won the Championship for the second time, a stroke ahead of Willie Park, Jr., the 1887 and 1889 winner. Hunter finished alone in eighth place with rounds of 82-79-81-77=319 and won £7 10s in prize money.

Death and legacy
Hunter died on 29 November 1946 in Prestwick, Scotland. He is best remembered as a maker of fine golf clubs and for a top-10 finish in the 1898 Open Championship.  He also won the 1907 Scottish PGA Championship.

Results in major championships

Note: Hunter played only in The Open Championship.

DNP = did not play
CUT = missed the half-way cut
WD = withdrew
"T" indicates a tie for a place
Yellow background for top-10

References

Scottish male golfers
Sportspeople from South Ayrshire
People from Prestwick
1871 births
1946 deaths